San Gabriel , officially the Municipality of San Gabriel, is a 4th class municipality in the province of La Union, Philippines. According to the 2020 census, it has a population of 18,943 people.

It is the largest municipality by land area in the province of La Union. One of the landlocked towns of the province, San Gabriel is bounded on the north by Santol with an imaginary line from a point in Ticor following the Malanas River; on the east by the Province of Benguet with an imaginary line from the Bacawayan River Junction going south following a creek to Cabassitan River up to Barangay Duplas of San Juan, southwest by San Juan with an imaginary line from Duplas following the Cabassitan River westward to a point on a concrete monument near the place known as Alangigan and from this monument going north-west making an imaginary line to Sitio Bato crossing the Dayacos River, and on the west by Bacnotan from Sitio Bato to a point in Lacong, from this point going straight with an imaginary line to Ticor, North of Sitio Matagectec, Barangay Lacong.

History
San Gabriel was formerly known as sitio “Baka-Burnotan”, derived from “binnornutan” (English: "tug-of-war"). The sitio was the meeting place of both Christians and pagan Kankanaey settlers from nearby sitios to graze their cattle while playing the game. The name was later shortened to "burnotan". The wide plain and fertile soil attracted Christian and pagan settlers, who later intermarried which led to the increase in population.

On April 19, 1897, a Roman Catholic priest Father Redondo established a church in the area and introduced the patron saint to be Saint Gabriel, from which the town was later named.

In 1906, San Gabriel was made into a township under the sub-province of Amburayan in Mountain Province, with the first Presidente being Don Pablo Waggay. The township was converted into a municipal district of Amburayan in 1920, and into a municipality in 1922, following the settlement of a boundary dispute between La Union and Mountain Province. In 1947, San Gabriel was converted into a regular municipality by virtue of Executive Order No. 72 issued by President Manuel Roxas through the sponsorship of former House Speaker Pro-Tempore Francisco Ortega.

Geography

Barangays
San Gabriel is politically subdivided into 15 barangays. These barangays are headed by elected officials: Barangay Captain, Barangay Council, whose members are called Barangay Councilors. All are elected every three years.

 Amontoc 
 Apayao
 Balbalayang
 Bayabas
 Bucao
 Bumbuneg
 Daking
 Lacong
 Lipay Este
 Lipay Norte
 Lipay Proper
 Lipay Sur
 Lon-oy
 Poblacion
 Polipol

Climate

Demographics

Economy

San Gabriel is an agricultural town. In its early days, the people of San Gabriel were engaged mainly in highland farming as their means of livelihood. They produced rice, corn, sweet potatoes, and other root crops. As years passed, crop production decreased due to massive soil erosion in the uplands. Nevertheless, the inhabitants decided to improve their farming techniques and started making terraces. The perseverance of the people in constructing rice terraces and irrigation system along the hills and mountains of San Gabriel caused agricultural productivity to rebound.

Bananas and tiger grass ("Thysanolaena maxina") are also abundant in San Gabriel, which harvests materials for soft broom production on a weekly basis.

Government
San Gabriel, belonging to the first congressional district of the province of La Union, is governed by a mayor designated as its local chief executive and by a municipal council as its legislative body in accordance with the Local Government Code. The mayor, vice mayor, and the councilors are elected directly by the people through an election which is being held every three years.

Elected officials

Tourism
Gumayenggeng Falls at Barangay Lipay
Katebbegan Fall at Barangay Lipay Proper
Bakes Falls and Lon-oy Spring at Barangay Lon-oy
Lineng Pool at Poblacion
Tinnag-Americano Falls at Barangay Polipol
Tangadan Falls located at Barangay Amontoc

Education

High schools

The town has 4 Public High Schools and 1 Private School.
 Saint Gabriel the Archangel High School, former (San Gabriel Academy) is the only private school secondary in the municipality, a Christian School that demands love and discipline from all who join the SGA High School Family.
 Balbalayang National High School
 Lipay Integrated School
 San Gabriel Senior High School
 San Gabriel Vocational High School

Gallery

References

External links

 [ Philippine Standard Geographic Code]
 Philippine Census Information
 Local Governance Performance Management System

Municipalities of La Union
Establishments by Philippine executive order